"Silence in the Library" is the eighth episode of the fourth series of the revived British science fiction television series Doctor Who. It was first broadcast on BBC One on 31 May 2008. It is the first of a two-part story; the second part, "Forest of the Dead", aired on 7 June. The two episodes make up the second two-parter Steven Moffat contributed to the series after "The Empty Child" and "The Doctor Dances" from the first series.

In the episode, the archaeologist River Song (Alex Kingston) summons the alien time traveller the Tenth Doctor (David Tennant) to a planet-sized library in the 51st century, where thousands of visitors disappeared without a trace a hundred years earlier when the library was shut off. The episode establishes that River Song has met the Doctor on many occasions but at this point in his life the Doctor does not recognise her.

The Hugo Award-nominated episode is also significant for introducing the character of River Song, who went on to play an important role in future stories.

Plot

The Tenth Doctor and Donna land on a planet-sized library in the 51st century simply called the Library. The Doctor has been summoned there, but a scan for life shows the Doctor and Donna as the only humanoid life signs but trillions of nonhuman life forms they cannot see or hear are present. An information node tells the Doctor and Donna that the library sealed itself, but that it has been breached and others are coming.

Just then, a team of explorers led by archaeologist River Song (who sent the message) and financed by Strackman Lux, whose grandfather originally built the Library, arrives. The team has come to determine why the library sealed itself 100 years previously. River acts like she knows the Doctor and has a diary with a cover decorated like the TARDIS with her. She discovers the Doctor has not met her yet.

The Library's operation system appears to be connected to the mind of a young girl living on 21st-century Earth. When the Doctor attempts to access the library computers, the girl causes books to fly from the shelves. The events happening in the library appear to her as television shows. The girl's psychiatrist Dr Moon tells her that the library in her imagination is actually real and that her real world is a lie. He implores her to save the people who have arrived at the library.

Lux's secretary Miss Evangelista is attacked by Vashta Nerada which strip her flesh clean to the bone instantly. The Doctor and Donna learn that the team are wearing communication devices which can store their thought patterns even after death, and are disturbed to hear Miss Evangelista still talking but acting confused until her pattern degrades. The Doctor explains that the Vashta Nerada are creatures that appear as shadows to hunt but are usually not as aggressive.

After noticing the pilot Proper Dave has two shadows, the Doctor and River seal him in his space suit, with the Doctor discovering River has a sonic screwdriver. The Vashta Nerada still get in, stripping Dave to his bare skeleton. The creatures animate Dave's suit and chase after the others. The Doctor attempts to teleport Donna back to the TARDIS for her safety, but Donna fails to materialise properly. The Doctor finds an information node with Donna's face on it which tells him that Donna has left the library and been saved.

Continuity
According to Steven Moffat, the squareness gun used by Song to help the party escape from the Vashta Nerada is intended to be the same sonic blaster that was used by Jack Harkness (John Barrowman) in the episode "The Doctor Dances". Moffat suggests that it was left in the TARDIS after "The Parting of the Ways", and taken by Song in the Doctor's future.  The name "squareness gun" was coined by Rose Tyler (Billie Piper) in the former episode.

Production

Writing
Originally, the two-parter was scheduled to take place during the show's third series. Initially, Moffat had wanted to introduce the villainous Weeping Angels in the entry after seeing an angel statue in a graveyard whilst on a family holiday. However, after withdrawing from the writing of series three's first two-part story—Helen Raynor took over these episodes, writing "Daleks in Manhattan" and "Evolution of the Daleks"—Moffat volunteered to write the series' Doctor-lite episode and opted to use the Weeping Angels in what would become "Blink". Later, during the fourth series, Moffat revisited his previous ideas. He felt that the library would be a "great setting" for Doctor Who that was not too exotic. The character of River Song was originally created for the plot to make more sense. Moffat knew that the team of archaeologists would have to trust the Doctor, but that the Doctor's psychic paper could not explain and convince the team why he had appeared in a sealed-off library. Therefore, Moffat intended for the Doctor to know one of the archaeologists. Later, he decided that this idea was too "dull", and instead opted to have one of them know him.

Casting
For the role of River Song, whom executive producer Russell T Davies described as "sort of the Doctor's wife", the production sought to cast Kate Winslet. One of Winslet's first acting roles was in the BBC1 teen drama Dark Season, written by Davies. The role of River Song eventually went to Alex Kingston, known for starring in the popular US drama ER. On Kingston's casting, Davies said "I bloody love her!" Kingston had been a fan of Doctor Who as a child. Kingston did not initially expect her role to be recurring, only later learning that Moffat had always intended for Song to come back for return appearances. Kingston enjoyed getting to play an unusual action hero female role, and praised the show for its variety of settings and opportunities "to relive one's childhood fantasies" playing with laser guns and wearing varied costumes from one appearance to the next. In regards to having to speak complicated dialogue, she said that she had "work[ed] with a medical consultant on ER, who'd explain what we were saying, so I'd say it with a purpose and a truth. On Doctor Who, I've no idea what some of my lines mean!"

Discussing her role alongside Tennant and Tate in her 2008 introductory episode, Kingston said, "We just clicked. I've done guest roles on other shows, but rarely have I felt such a warm bond." About working with Kingston, Tate later said that, "I'm a huge ER fan. When you hold people in awe, it's almost a disappointment when they come in and they're utterly normal. But Alex isn't disappointing at all. She's such a lovely person." Tennant was quoted as saying that, "Alex is terrific. When she's telling you stories about hanging out with George Clooney, you know she's pretty cool."

In 2020, Moffat revealed that he had envisioned Colin Salmon's character as a future incarnation of the Doctor. 

Salmon later played Salway in the audio play Wirrn Dawn.

Daniel Peacock, the brother of Harry Peacock, who here plays Proper Dave, had previously appeared in the 1988 serial The Greatest Show in the Galaxy as Nord the Vandal.

Filming and effects
Filming took place at the Old Swansea Central Library in late January and early February 2008, and the Brangwyn Hall in Swansea, Wales.

The presence of the Vashta Nerada was created with lighting managed by director of photography Rory Taylor. To draw the eye toward the shadows, they were deepened in post-production by visual effects company The Mill.

The establishing shots of the CGI cityscape of the Library was created in Cinema 4D using the Advanced Render 3 module. This effort was nominated for a VES Award in 2009.

Broadcast and reception

Release and ratings
Before the episode was aired, The Sun obtained a copy of the script and threatened to release it, to which Moffat responded: "'let them' – I'd like to see The Sun publish that many words in a day!" Just as in 2007, the BBC pushed Doctor Who a week further due to their coverage of the Eurovision Song Contest 2008 which took place on 24 May. "Silence in the Library" was scheduled against the final of ITV's talent contest Britain's Got Talent and suffered in the ratings as a result. BARB's final figures recorded an audience 6.27 million when adjusted for time shifting, whereas Britain's Got Talent was viewed by 11.52 million in comparison. This was the first time since the series' revival in 2005 that Doctor Who did not have the largest audience share in its timeslot. However, the episode did receive an Appreciation Index score of 89 (considered "Excellent"), the joint highest figure the new series had received to date, alongside "The Parting of the Ways", "Doomsday" and the following episode "Forest of the Dead". BBC Three's repeat of the episode was watched by 1.35 million viewers, almost double the figures for the equivalent repeat of the previous episode, "The Unicorn and the Wasp".

Critical reception and accolades
The episode has received positive reviews from critics. William Gallagher of Radio Times labelled it the "best story so far" and was positive toward the character of River Song. IGN's Travis Fickett gave it a rating of 9.2 out of 10, praising the setting of a library with books and "terrifically entertaining dialogue, one mind boggling concept after another, terrific character moments" between all the characters. However, he thought the concept of the Vashta Nerada were "a bit goofy", especially when they took the form of the skeletons. Ben Rawson-Jones on Digital Spy gave "Silence in the Library" four out of five stars, praising the "wonderfully inventive concepts" of the Data Ghosts and Nodes as well as guest stars Kingston, Salmon, and Newton. However, his "slight criticism" was that some aspects were similar to other episodes Moffat had written for Doctor Who. Richard Edwards, reviewing for SFX, gave the episode five out of five stars and called it the "best of the series so far". He particularly praised the fear instilled by the Vashta Nerada and the "intriguing parallel plotline" of the little girl.

Den of Geek listed the cliffhanger for "Silence in the Library" among the ten greatest of the show in 2011. IGN named the two-parter the fourth best episode of Tennant's tenure, as did Sam McPherson of Zap2it. This episode, along with "Forest of the Dead", was nominated for a Hugo Award in the Best Dramatic Presentation, Short Form category, but lost out to Dr. Horrible's Sing-Along Blog. The episode won the 2009 Constellation Award for Best Script in Film or Television.

References

External links

 Episode commentary from producer Phil Collinson and director Euros Lyn

Tenth Doctor episodes
2008 British television episodes
Television episodes written by Steven Moffat
Fiction set in the 6th millennium
Works set in libraries